Rolf Fringer  (born 26 January 1957) is an Austrian football manager and former player. He has managed the Switzerland national football team and numerous Swiss football clubs.

Career
He led FC Aarau to the 1992–93 Swiss national title. At FC Luzern he was known for his counterattacking football. He was replaced as Luzern manager by Murat Yakin.

In April 2012 it was announced that Rolf Fringer would join FC Zürich as manager in summer 2012. When he was appointed he stated that it was his proudest day as he was an FCZ fan as a child. His first transfer as manager was to sign Burim Kukeli, whom he had managed at FC Luzern. On 26 November it was announced following a board meeting to relieve Fringer of his duties, with FC Zürich sitting at 7th in the Super League.

References

External links

1957 births
Living people
Association football defenders
Austrian footballers
Swiss men's footballers
FC Luzern players
FC Schaffhausen players
Austrian football managers
Swiss football managers
Bundesliga managers
Switzerland national football team managers
Apollon Limassol FC managers
VfB Stuttgart managers
PAOK FC managers
FC Aarau managers
FC St. Gallen managers
FC Luzern managers
FC Schaffhausen managers
Expatriate football managers in Switzerland
Expatriate football managers in Germany
Expatriate football managers in Cyprus
Expatriate football managers in Greece